Merewether Heights is a suburb of Newcastle, New South Wales, Australia, located  southwest of Newcastle's central business district near the Glenrock State Recreation Area. It is part of the City of Newcastle local government area.

References

 

Suburbs of Newcastle, New South Wales